Grenki med is a novel by Slovenian author Andrej E. Skubic. It was first published in 1999.

See also
List of Slovenian novels

Slovenian novels
1999 novels